Anthurium regale is a species of plant in the genus Anthurium native to Peru. It is best known for its large, cordate leaves with deep white veins. It was first described by Europeans in the 1866 edition of La Belgique Horticole, where it was noted to be first collected for the houseplant trade by Gustav Wallis during his time working for Jean Jules Linden.

References

regale
Flora of Peru
Plants described in 1866